Leskovik  is a town and a former municipality in the Korçë County, southeastern Albania. At the 2015 local government reform it became a subdivision of the municipality Kolonjë. It is located right at the Greek-Albanian border. The population at the 2011 census was 1,525.

History

Etymology
The toponym Leskovik is formed from the Slavic word leska meaning ‘hazel, corylus avellana’ or ‘hazel river' along with the suffix ik(ë). The name of the town has been written as Lexovico in a map (1821) by Pouqueville and as Leskovik in an Ottoman document (1851).

Ottoman period
The area came under Ottoman rule in the 15th century and became part of the Sanjak of Ioannina. Leskovik was recognized as a town in the early 1800s. It was conceived as a relaxing and retreat center for the Ottoman administration. Leskovik subsequently was elevated from kaza into a sanjak. Leskovik kaza (subdistrict) was located within Yanya sanjak, part of Yanya Vilayet (province) till 1912.

Leskovik and the nearby mountain Melesin was the site of a battle in 1831.

Ottoman Albanian spahis and landowners from nineteenth century Leskovik owned estate properties (chiftlik) in parts of the Balkans and in particular the Thessalian plain, until its loss to Greece in 1881 leading to local economic decline and increasing reliance on agriculture.
 
Leskovik was a significant centre for the Sufi Bektashi order and it was strongly established in the surrounding area. The Sufi Halveti order was also present in the town and the Sufi Hayatiyya order had a tekke dating from 1796. In the late Ottoman period and on the eve of the Balkan Wars, the population of Leskovik was mostly Muslim Bektashi. In Leskovik, a Bektashi tekke was founded in 1887 by Abedin Baba, a town native and religious figure. The tekke housed a small number of dervishes and Abedin Baba's gravesite, later destroyed by war. Another religious building was the Pazar (Bazaar) mosque of Leskovik. A few Muslim Albanians from Leskovik were employed in the Ottoman bureaucracy as administrative officials governing some districts in parts of the empire. Greek education was present in Leskovik at the 1898-1899 school year with one boys' and one girls' school and a total of 100 pupils attending them.

During the Balkan Wars (1912-1913) Ottoman rule came to an end and Leskovik briefly came under the control of the Greek forces. Shortly after the town was visited by an international commission who was responsible to draw the precise borders between the Kingdom of Greece and the newly established Principality of Albania. There was some difficulty in drawing the new border by the international demarcation border commission as the area around Leskovik and nearby Konitsa contained mixed populations of Albanians and Greeks. After the partition of Leskovik kaza (1913) along demographic lines, its Greek settlements went to Greece and its Albanian settlements became part of Albania, with Leskovik itself placed in the Albanian province of Kolonjë.

Leskovik was finally ceded to Albania under the terms of the Protocol of Florence (17 December 1913). In  the town officially joined the Autonomous Republic of Northern Epirus.

World War II
At 21 November 1940, during the Greco-Italian War, units of the II Army Corps of the advancing Greek forces entered Leskovik after breaching the Italian defences. Latter, the town showed a strong support to communist partisans during the Italian and German World War II occupation.

Cold War
The People's Socialist Republic of Albania, being an ally of the Soviet Union, was involved in the Greek Civil War (1946-1949) by supporting the communist led Greek Democratic Army. Leskovik became for a period its headquarters. The town also hosted a training, a supply center, as well as medical facilities for the communist guerrillas, who mounted several invasions from Albanian soil into the Greek region of Grammos and fled back to Albania once an operation was completed.

Today
The population has decreased after the 1990s, due to emigration. In the modern period, the town of Leskovik is religiously mixed, composed of Muslim Bektashis and Eastern Orthodox Christians. Part of the Eastern Orthodox community consists of Aromanians that are found in mixed neighbourhoods in the town.

Few monuments in Leskovik surviving its turbulent past are the decorated tomb of Kani Pasha, located inside the present Bektashi tekke.

In the wider area, the religious composition is distributed between Islam: (Bektashis and Halvetis) such as in nearby Gjonç and Gline and Christianity (mostly Orthodoxy) with some converts to Orthodoxy, others to Roman Catholicism and Protestantism, as well as some irreligious people.

Geography
Leskovik is located 0.7 miles from Melesin mountain, inside Ersekë-Konitsa-Çarshovë triangle.

Notable people
Ibrahim Sirri Leskoviku, Albanian politician.
Abedin Baba (Leskoviku) - Bektashi religious figure and poet.
Vasileios Sotiriadis, Greek politician.
Ahmed Vefiku, Albanian politician.
Jani Vreto, Albanian rilindas, born in the village of Postenan within Leskovik municipality.
Asllan Rusi, volleyball player, the main volleyball arena in Tirana bears his name
Mustafa Hilmi Leskoviku, better known as Muço Qulli, Albanian patriot, publicist, publisher of "Populli" newspaper in Shkodër
Ajdin Asllan, musician and patriot, Vatra activist, composer of Vatra's hymn
Naim Frashëri (actor)

References

External links
"Zylyfar Poda" dance

 

Former municipalities in Korçë County
Administrative units of Kolonjë, Korçë
Towns in Albania
Aromanian settlements in Albania